The Köroğlu Mountains (Turkish: Köroğlu Dağları) are a mountain range situated in the northern Turkey, north of Ankara. It rises along the North Anatolian Fault and the Black Sea.

This range crosses the provinces of Bolu, Çankırı and Çorum, and its limits are Sakarya River, to the west, and Kızılırmak River, to the east.

The highest place, situated south of Bolu, is an andesitic formation, constituted by a plateau where is situated the highest point of this range, Köroğlu Tepesi, at 2,499 m (8,200 ft) above sea level. This place has forests with firs and pines, extensive summer pastures and picturesque yaylas (mountain resorts with alpine cabins).

Recently, two ski resorts near Köroğlu Tepesi were inaugurated: Kartalkaya and Sarialan, with altitudes between 1,900 m (6,233 ft) and 2,378 m (7,802 ft).

References

External links

Mountain ranges of Turkey
Central Anatolia Region
Black Sea Region
Landforms of Bolu Province
Landforms of Çankırı Province
Landforms of Çorum Province